Borve Castle may refer to:

Borve Castle, Benbecula a stronghold of the Clan Donald.
Borve Castle, Sutherland a stronghold of the Clan Mackay.